Cabbage Key is a small island located off of Pine Island, Lee County, Florida. The island is about 100 acres and has a few residences on it.

The island is only accessible by boat, and in the 1940s, schoolchildren living on the island would be picked up by a boat to be taken to school. The island was named Cabbage Key during this period by residents Larry and Jan Stults.

References 

Gulf Coast barrier islands of Florida
Lee County, Florida